The Seven Mustangs, or simply Mustangs, is a bronze sculpture by Alexander Phimister Proctor located on the campus of the University of Texas at Austin. The sculpture was commissioned in 1937, modeled from 1939 to 1941, cast in 1947 and  dedicated on May 31, 1948.

See also
 1948 in art

References

External links
 

1948 establishments in Texas
1948 sculptures
Animal sculptures in Texas
Bronze sculptures in Texas
Horses in art
Outdoor sculptures in Austin, Texas
Sculptures by Alexander Phimister Proctor
Statues in Austin, Texas
University of Texas at Austin campus